Nikhoj is a 2022 Bangladeshi  drama limited series created by Reehan Rahman and starring  Afsana Mimi, Shatabdi Wadud. Intekhab Dinar and Orchita Sporshia premiered on Chorki on 17 March 2022.

Premise

Cast
 Afsana Mimi as Safiya Ahmed
 Orchita Sporshia as Young Safiya
 Shatabdi Wadud as Farukh Ahmed
 Intekhab Dinar as Hamidur Rahman
 Shamol Mawla as Saif Ahmed
 Masum Rezwan as young Saif
 Khairul Basar as Mamun Alam
 Deepanwita Martin as Faria Rahman
 Shilpi Sarkar Apu as Rabeya Ahmed

Episodes

Release
The series premiered with all 6 episodes on 17 March 2022 on Chorki.

References

External links
 Nikhoj on Chorki
 

Chorki original programming
Bengali-language web series
Bangladeshi web series
2022 web series debuts
2022 Bangladeshi television series debuts
Streaming television in Bangladesh
Bengali-language nonlinear narrative television series
Television series about dysfunctional families
Nonlinear narrative television series
2020s Bangladeshi drama television series